Abortion in Oklahoma is illegal unless the abortion is necessary to save the life of a pregnant woman in a medical emergency, or the pregnancy resulted from an act of rape, sexual assault, or incest that has been reported to law enforcement. Even then, abortions in cases of rape, sexual assault, or incest are permitted only during the first six weeks of pregnancy, as a separate Oklahoma statute prohibits abortion after six weeks, with no exceptions for rape or incest.

On May 25, 2022, Oklahoma's abortion ban took effect when Governor Kevin Stitt signed HB 4327 into law. As of that date, abortion providers have ceased offering services. HB 4327 is modeled after the Texas Heartbeat Act, enforced solely through civil lawsuits brought by private citizens, which makes it exceedingly difficult for abortion providers to challenge the constitutionality of the statute in court. The usage of the term fetal heartbeat in this type of bill is contentious, with medical professionals positing that the terminology is inaccurate. this is because at the proposed time, (as early as 6 weeks) the conceptus is not yet considered a fetus, and is actually an embryo. additionally, there is no heart present in the embryo, it would more accurately be called a cluster of cells with electrical activity. Oklahoma is the first state to successfully ban abortion from the moment of fertilization since the overturning of Roe v. Wade. There are currently no abortion providers offering services in Oklahoma as a result of HB 4327.

Legislative history 
By 1950, the state legislature would pass a law that stated that a woman who had an abortion or actively sought to have an abortion regardless of whether she went through with it was guilty of a criminal offense.

The state passed a law in the 2000s banning abortions after 22 weeks because legislators alleged that a fetus could feel pain. The state was one of 23 states in 2007 to have a detailed abortion-specific informed consent requirement. The law required that materials be created by the state's health development. The informed consent materials required by statute to be given to women in Idaho, Oklahoma, South Dakota, and Texas used graphic and inflammatory language. The law also required the woman to be told how far advanced her pregnancy was. Arkansas, Minnesota, and Oklahoma all require that women seeking abortions after 20 weeks be verbally informed that the fetus may feel pain during the abortion procedure, despite a Journal of the American Medical Association conclusion that pain sensors do not develop in the fetus until between weeks 23 and 30. Informed consent materials about fetal pain at 20 weeks in Arkansas, Georgia, and Oklahoma state "the unborn child has the physical structures necessary to experience pain." In contrast, The Journal of the American Medical Association has concluded that pain sensors do not develop in the fetus until 23-30 weeks.

A 2009 Oklahoma law, overturned by a federal court in 2010, would have required doctors to report information from a 37-question form about every woman receiving an abortion to the state health department for publication in an online registry. A lawyer for the Center for Reproductive Rights, a co-plaintiff in the lawsuit challenging the law, said the law would have made public potentially identifying details about women, and was intended to dissuade women from seeking abortions. Todd Lamb, who sponsored the law as a state senator, called it "essential in protecting the sanctity of life" and "pro-life". A fetal heartbeat bill (SB 1274) was signed into law by then-Oklahoma Governor Mary Fallin in April 2012 that required an abortion provider to offer a woman the opportunity to hear the conceptus's heartbeat before ending the pregnancy and applied when the conceptus was at least eight weeks old. The bill took effect in November 2012.

In 2013, the Targeted Regulation of Abortion Providers (TRAP) law applied to medication-induced abortions in addition to abortion clinics. In 2016, Oklahoma state legislators passed a bill to criminalize abortion for providers, potentially charging them with up to three years in prison. On May 20, 2016, Governor Mary Fallin vetoed the bill before it could become law, citing its wording as too vague to withstand a legal challenge. The state legislature was one of four states nationwide that tried, and failed, to pass a "fetal heartbeat" bill in 2016.

In 2017, the state was one of six where the legislature introduced a bill that would have banned abortion in almost all cases. It did not pass. They were also one of eight states trying to pass a "fetal heartbeat" bill that year. The state legislature tried and failed to ban abortion again in 2018. They also tried and failed to pass a "fetal heartbeat" bill that year. In mid-May 2019, state law banned abortion after week 22.

Oklahoma's abortion ban took effect on May 25, 2022, when Governor Kevin Stitt signed HB 4327 into law, and abortion providers ceased offering services in Oklahoma as of that date. HB 4327 is modeled after the Texas Heartbeat Act and is enforced solely through civil lawsuits brought by private citizens, making it exceedingly difficult for abortion providers to challenge the constitutionality of the statute in court. Oklahoma is the first state to successfully ban abortion from the moment of fertilization since Roe v. Wade.

Judicial history 
The US Supreme Court's decision in 1973's Roe v. Wade ruling meant the state could no longer regulate abortion in the first trimester. (However, the Supreme Court overturned Roe v. Wade in Dobbs v. Jackson Women's Health Organization,  later in 2022.) On November 4, 2013, the U.S. Supreme Court declined to hear an appeal by the state of Oklahoma to the overturning, on constitutional grounds, of a bill intended to ban the practice of terminations of early pregnancies via medication.

In March 2020, Governor Kevin Stitt signed an executive order to limit elective medical procedures, later confirming that all types of abortion services were included, except for those necessary in a medical emergency or to "prevent serious health risks" to the pregnant woman. On April 6, federal judge Charles Barnes Goodwin blocked the executive order, ruling that the state "acted in an 'unreasonable,' 'arbitrary,' and 'oppressive' way," which "imposed an 'undue' burden on abortion access" in Oklahoma.

Clinic history 

 Between 1982 and 1992, the number of abortion clinics in the state decreased by seven, going from eighteen in 1982 to eleven in 1992. In the period between 1992 and 1996, the state saw no change in the total number of abortion clinics. While only three states saw gains in this period, this state was one of four to see no changes with 11 abortion clinics in the state in 1996. In 2014, there were three abortion clinics in the state. In 2014, 96% of the counties in the state did not have an abortion clinic. That year, 54% of women in the state aged 15–44 lived in a county without an abortion clinic. In 2014, 51% of adults said in a poll by the Pew Research Center that abortion should be legal in all or most cases. In 2017, there were six Planned Parenthood clinics, of which one offered abortion services, in a state with a population of 882,108 women aged 15–49.

The first new clinic to provide abortion care opened in Oklahoma City in 2016, Trust Women Oklahoma City.

Statistics 
In the period between 1972 and 1974, there was one illegal abortion death in Oklahoma. In the same period, the state had an illegal abortion mortality rate per million women aged 15–44 of between 0.1 and 0.9. In 1990, 328,000 women in the state faced the risk of an unintended pregnancy. In 2010, the state had no publicly funded abortions. In 2013, among white women aged 15–19, there were 460 abortions, 110 abortions for black women aged 15–19, 0 abortions for Hispanic women aged 15–19, and 140 abortions for women of all other races. In 2017, the state had an infant mortality rate of 7.7 deaths per 1,000 live births.

Abortion rights views and activities

Protests 
Women from the state participated in marches supporting abortion rights as part of a #StoptheBans movement in May 2019. Many Oklahoman's who were supportive of abortion started protesting following restrictions on the procedure that were signed into law in May 2022. In June 2022, additional protests across several cities such as Oklahoma City, Norman, and Tulsa had risen substantially after the Supreme Court's ruling on Dobbs v. Jackson Women's Health Organization.

References 

Oklahoma
Healthcare in Oklahoma
Women in Oklahoma